António Rocha da Torre (1904 - 1995) was a Portuguese botanist and taxonomist. 

He carried out botanical expeditions to Mozambique, and to Portugal; over four decades, individually and in collaboration, the collection of more than 18,000 botanical specimens. His contributions were essential for the inventory of plant species, the characterization of the types of vegetation and the progress of taxonomic knowledge of the flora of Mozambique.
He sometimes collaborated with Jean Olive Dorothy Hillcoat of the Natural History Museum in London in collecting and describing specimens.

Selected publications 

  Antonio r. Torre, A.E. Gonçalves. 1976. Cassipourea fanshawei, sp. Nov. (Rhizophoraceae). Garcia de Orta, Ser. Bot. 3 (1): 49 

  Susana Saraiva, et al.. 2012. António Rocha da Torre and the Flora of Mozambique. Proceedings of the International Congress of Tropical Knowledge in Mozambique: History, Memory and Science  - IICT – JBT/Tropical Botanical Garden. Lisbon, 24-26 October 2012

Book chapters 
  A.E. Gonçalves, Antonio r. Torre. 1979. Flora de Moçambique. 67. Rhizophoraceae. Instituto de Investigação Científica Tropical (Institute for Tropical Scientific Research), Lisbon. 24 pp.
 Antonio r. Torre, A.E. Gonçalves. 1978. Rhizophoraceae. En: E. Launert, Flora Zambesiaca 4, 81-99, 5 est. Royal Botanic Gardens, Kew

Books

Honors

Eponyms 
Species
 (Asteraceae) Crassocephalum torreanum Lisowski

 (Solanaceae) Solanum torreanum A.E.Gonç.

References

External links 

20th-century Portuguese botanists
Portuguese taxonomists
1904 births
1995 deaths

Mozambican botanists